Henri Meschonnic (18 September 1932, in Paris – 8 April 2009, in Villejuif) was a French poet, linguist, essayist and translator. He is remembered today as both a theoretician of language and as a translator of the Old Testament. The 710-page Critique du rythme, probably remains his most famous theoretical work. As a translator of the Old Testament he published many volumes, including Les cinq rouleaux in 1970 (Song of Songs, Ruth, Lamentations, Ecclesiastes, Esther); Jona et le signifiant errant in 1998 (Jonah); Gloires in 2000 (Psalms); Au commencement in 2002 (Genesis); Les Noms in 2003 (Exodus); Et il a appelé in 2005 (Leviticus); and Dans le désert in 2008 (Numbers).

Awards
 1972 Max Jacob International Poetry Prize 
 1986 Mallarmé prize 
 2006 Prix de Littérature Nathan Katz pour l’ensemble de l’œuvre
 2007 International Grand Prix de poesie Guillevic-ville of Saint-Malo

References

External links
Henri Meschonnic (1932-2009) tribute by poet and translator Pierre Joris
Henri Meschonnic Blog a blog devoted to Meschonnic initiated by Piers Hugill
Henri Meschonnic 1932-2009 This "cyber-tombeau" at Silliman's Blog by poet Ron Silliman includes links 
 Dossier Henri Meschonnic sur le site "sur et autour de Philippe Sollers" Pileface 
 Colloque de Cerisy 
 Interview À la radio suisse italienne September 2003 
 Poèmes d'Henri Meschonnic 
 Éditions Verdier: Henri Meschonnic 
 Marko Pajević (ed.), The Henri Meschonnic Reader. A Poetics of Society, Edinburgh University Press 2019

1932 births
2009 deaths
Linguists from France
French translation scholars
French male poets
20th-century French poets
20th-century French translators
20th-century French male writers
French male non-fiction writers
20th-century linguists